The Oxford History of Art is a monographic series about the history of art, design and architecture published by Oxford University Press. It combines volumes covering specific periods with thematic volumes. The history is divided into histories of Western Art, Western Architecture, World Art, Western Design, Photography, Western Sculpture, Themes and Genres, and a critical anthology of art writing. The entire work consists of over 30 volumes.

Series

Similar Series
Pelican History of Art, now published by Yale University Press
Thames & Hudson's The World of Art

References 

Oxford University Press books
Art history books
Series of history books